Pachuta is a town in Clarke County, Mississippi, United States. The population was 261 at the 2010 census.

History
Pachuta was founded in the 1880s, and named after Pachuta Creek.

Geography
Pachuta is located in western Clarke County at  (32.041081, -88.883636). U.S. Route 11 passes through the center of town, leading north  to Meridian and south  to Laurel. Mississippi Highway 18 crosses US 11 at the town center, leading east  to Quitman, the county seat (taking Highway 512 cuts the distance to ), and west  to Bay Springs.

Demographics

2020 census

As of the 2020 United States census, there were 207 people, 78 households, and 43 families residing in the town.

2000 census
As of the census of 2000, there were 245 people, 106 households, and 71 families residing in the town. The population density was 107.0 people per square mile (41.3/km). There were 126 housing units at an average density of 55.0 per square mile (21.2/km). The racial makeup of the town was 66.12% White, 33.06% African American, 0.82% from other races.

There were 106 households, out of which 24.5% had children under the age of 18 living with them, 48.1% were married couples living together, 17.9% had a female householder with no husband present, and 32.1% were non-families. 28.3% of all households were made up of individuals, and 14.2% had someone living alone who was 65 years of age or older. The average household size was 2.31 and the average family size was 2.81.

In the town, the population was spread out, with 21.6% under the age of 18, 6.5% from 18 to 24, 26.9% from 25 to 44, 24.9% from 45 to 64, and 20.0% who were 65 years of age or older. The median age was 43 years. For every 100 females, there were 71.3 males. For every 100 females age 18 and over, there were 67.0 males.

The median income for a household in the town was $30,938, and the median income for a family was $35,313. Males had a median income of $26,750 versus $21,250 for females. The per capita income for the town was $12,181. About 20.0% of families and 17.8% of the population were below the poverty line, including 34.5% of those under the age of eighteen and 5.0% of those 65 or over.

Education
The town of Pachuta is served by the Quitman School District.

Notable person
 Bob Hicks, activist during the Civil Rights Movement

References

Towns in Clarke County, Mississippi
Towns in Mississippi
Meridian micropolitan area
Mississippi placenames of Native American origin